Urius was an Alemannic petty king in the 4th century. The Roman writer Ammianus Marcellinus reports that Julian crossed the Rhine at Mainz in 359 and concluded a peace treaty with the Alemannic kings Urius, Hariobaudes, Macrian, Vadomarius, Ursicinus and Vestralpus.

Sources
 Thorsten Fischer: Urius. In: Reallexikon der Germanischen Altertumskunde (RGA). 2. Auflage. Band 31, Walter de Gruyter, Berlin / New York 2006, S. 544–545.
 Dieter Geuenich: Geschichte der Alemannen (= Kohlhammer Verlag, Urban-Taschenbücher. 575). 2., überarbeitete Auflage. Kohlhammer, Stuttgart 2005, .

4th-century Germanic people
Alemannic rulers
Alemannic warriors